Neoterpes edwardsata is a species of geometrid moth in the family Geometridae. It is found in North America.

The MONA or Hodges number for Neoterpes edwardsata is 6861.

References

Further reading

External links

 

Ourapterygini
Articles created by Qbugbot
Moths described in 1871